Kashuni is a village in the Tatev Municipality of the Syunik Province in Armenia.

Toponymy 
The village was previously known as Maldash.

Demographics

Population 
In the 2011 census, the reported population was 11, reduced from the 27 reported at the 2001 census.

References 

Populated places in Syunik Province